The Bestune B90 (formerly Besturn B80) is an Mid-size car produced by the Chinese car manufacturer Besturn.

Overview

The engine of the Besturn B90 was made by Mazda. It was unveiled at the Shanghai Motor Show in 2011 as a concept car, it later appeared at the Beijing Motor Show in 2012. Production of the sedan started on 16 July 2012, and delivery began on 22 August 2012. The B90 was revised in 2014.

In 2013, Pyeonghwa Motors licensed produce variant version of B90 under the name of Hwiparam 2009. 

Production of the vehicle ended in 2017.

References

B90
Executive cars
Cars introduced in 2012